Alexander is a male given name. The most prominent bearer of the name is Alexander the Great, the king of the Ancient Greek kingdom of Macedonia who created one of the largest empires in ancient history.

Variants listed here are Aleksandar, Aleksander and Aleksandr. Related names and diminutives include Iskandar, Alec, Alek, Alex, Alexandre, Aleks, Aleksa and Sander; feminine forms include Alexandra, Alexandria, and Sasha.

Etymology
It is a compound of the verb  ('to ward off, avert, defend') and the noun  (genitive: , ;  meaning 'man'). It is an example of the widespread motif of Greek names expressing "battle-prowess", in this case the ability to withstand or push back an enemy battle line.

Alaksandu, alternatively called Alakasandu or Alaksandus, was a king of Wilusa who sealed a treaty with the Hittite king Muwatalli II ca. 1280 BC; this is generally assumed to have been a Greek called Alexandros.

The name was one of the epithets given to the Greek goddess Hera and as such is usually taken to mean "one who comes to save warriors". In the Iliad, the character Paris is known also as Alexander. The name's popularity was spread throughout the Greek world by the military conquests of King Alexander III, commonly known as "Alexander the Great". Most later Alexanders in various countries were directly or indirectly named after him.

People known as Alexander
Alexander has been the name of many rulers, including kings of Macedon, of Scotland, emperors of Russia and popes.

Rulers of antiquity

Alexander (Alexandros of Ilion), more often known as Paris of Troy
Alexander of Corinth, 10th king of Corinth (816–791 BC)
Alexander I of Macedon
Alexander II of Macedon
Alexander III of Macedon, commonly known as Alexander the Great
Alexander IV of Macedon
Alexander V of Macedon
Alexander of Pherae despot of Pherae between 369 and 358 BC
Alexander I of Epirus king of Epirus about 342 BC
Alexander II of Epirus king of Epirus 272 BC
Alexander of Corinth, viceroy of Antigonus Gonatas and ruler of a rump state based on Corinth c. 250 BC
Alexander (satrap) (died 220 BC), satrap of Persis under Seleucid king Antiochus III
Alexander Balas, ruler of the Seleucid kingdom of Syria between 150 and 146 BC
Alexander Zabinas, ruler of part of the Seleucid kingdom of Syria based in Antioch between 128 and 123 BC
Alexander Jannaeus king of Judea, 103–76 BC
Alexander of Judaea, son of Aristobulus II, king of Judaea
Alexander Severus (208–235), Roman emperor
Julius Alexander, lived in the 2nd century, an Emesene nobleman
Domitius Alexander, Roman usurper who declared himself emperor in 308

Rulers of the Middle Ages
Alexander, Byzantine Emperor (912–913)
Alexander I of Scotland (c. 1078–1124)
Alexander II of Scotland (1198–1249)
Alexander Nevsky (1220–1263), Prince of Novgorod and Grand Prince of Vladimir
Alexander III of Scotland (1241–1286)
Nicholas Alexander of Wallachia, Voivode of Wallachia (?-1364)
Ivan Alexander of Bulgaria, tsar of Bulgaria (beginnings of the 14th century-1371)
Aleksandr Mikhailovich of Tver, Prince of Tver as Alexander I and Grand Prince of Vladimir-Suzdal as Alexander II (1301–1339)
Sikandar Khan Ghazi, Vizier of Sylhet (from 1303)
Aleksander (1338–before 1386), Prince of Podolia (son of Narymunt)
Sikandar Shah Miri, better known as Sikandar Butshikan ("Sikandar the Iconoclast"), sixth sultan of the Shah Miri dynasty of Kashmir (1353–1413)
Sikandar Shah, Sultan of Bengal (1358–1390)
Alexander II of Georgia (1483–1510)
Alexandru I Aldea, ruler of the principality of Wallachia (1431–1436)
Eskender, Emperor of Ethiopia (1472–1494)
Alexander Jagiellon (Alexander of Poland), King of Poland (1461–1506)
Nuruddin Sikandar Shah, Sultan of Bengal (1481)
Alexandru Lăpuşneanu, Voivode of Moldavia (1499–1568)
Sikandar Shah of Gujarat, ruler of Gujarat Sultanate (?-1526)
Sikandar Shah Suri, Sur dynasty, Shah of Delhi (?-1559)
Alexandru II Mircea, Voivode or Prince of Wallachia (1529–1577)

Modern rulers
Alexander I of Russia (1777–1825), emperor of Russia
Alexander II of Russia (1818–1881), emperor of Russia
Alexander III of Russia (1845–1894), emperor of Russia
Alexander Karađorđević, Prince of Serbia (1842–1858)
Alexander of Bulgaria (1857–1893), first prince of modern Bulgaria
Alexandru Ioan Cuza, first prince of unified Romania (1859–1866)
Alexander I Obrenović of Serbia (1876–1903), king of Serbia
Alexander, Prince of Lippe (1831–1905), prince of Lippe
Alexander I of Yugoslavia (1888–1934), first king of Yugoslavia
Alexander, Crown Prince of Yugoslavia (born 1945), head of the Yugoslav Royal Family
Zog I, also known as Skenderbeg III (1895–1961), king of Albanians
Alexander of Greece (1893–1920), king of Greece
Leka, Crown Prince of Albania (1939–2011), king of Albanians (throne pretender)
Willem-Alexander, King of the Netherlands (born 1967), eldest child of Queen Beatrix and Prince Claus

Other royalty
Alexander, Judean Prince, one of the sons of Herod the Great from his wife Mariamne
Alexander Helios, Ptolemaic prince, one of the sons of Cleopatra and Mark Anthony
Alexander, Judean Prince, son to the above Alexander and Cappadocian princess Glaphyra
Alexander (d. 1418), son of Bulgarian tsar Ivan Shishman
Prince Alexander John of Wales (1871), short-lived son of Edward VII
Prince Alexandre of Belgium (1942–2009)
Prince Alfred of Edinburgh and Saxe-Coburg and Gotha (1874–1899)
Olav V of Norway (Prince Alexander of Denmark) (1903–1991)

Religious leaders
Pope Alexander I (pope 97–105)
Alexander of Apamea, 5th-century bishop of Apamea
Pope Alexander II (pope 1058–1061)
Pope Alexander III (pope 1159–1181)
Pope Alexander IV (pope 1243–1254)
Pope Alexander V ("Peter Philarges" c. 1339–1410)
Pope Alexander VI (1492–1503), Roman pope
Pope Alexander VII (1599–1667)
Pope Alexander VIII (pope 1689–1691)
Alexander of Constantinople, bishop of Constantinople (314–337)
St. Alexander of Alexandria, Coptic Pope, Patriarch of Alexandria between 313 and 328
Pope Alexander II of Alexandria, Coptic Pope (702–729)
Alexander of Lincoln, bishop of Lincoln
Alexander of Jerusalem
See also Saint Alexander, various saints with this name

Other people

Antiquity
Alexander (artists), the name of a number of artists of ancient Greece and Rome
Alexander of Lyncestis (died 330 BC), contemporary of Alexander the Great
Alexander (son of Polyperchon) (died 314 BC), regent of Macedonia
Alexander (Antigonid general), 3rd-century BC cavalry commander under Antigonus III Doson
Alexander of Athens, 3rd-century BC Athenian comic poet
Alexander Aetolus, poet and member of the Alexandrian Pleiad
Alexander (son of Lysimachus), Macedonian royal
Alexander (grandson of Seleucus I Nicator), Greek Anatolian nobleman
Alexander (Aetolian general), briefly conquered Aegira in 220 BC
Alexander of Acarnania (died 191 BC), confidante of Antiochus III the Great
Alexander Isius, Aetolian military commander
Alexander Lychnus, early 1st-century BC poet and historian
Alexander Philalethes, 1st century BC physician
Alexander Polyhistor, Greek scholar of the 1st century BC
Alexander of Myndus, ancient Greek writer on zoology and divination
Alexander of Aegae, peripatetic philosopher of the 1st century AD
Alexander of Cotiaeum, 2nd-century Greek grammarian and tutor of Marcus Aurelius
Alexander Numenius, 2nd-century Greek rhetorician
Alexander Peloplaton, 2nd-century Greek rhetorician
Alexander of Abonoteichus, Greek religious leader and imposter
Alexander of Aphrodisias, Greek commentator and philosopher
Alexander of Lycopolis, 4th-century author of an early Christian treatise against Manicheans
Alexander, a member of the Jerusalem Temple Sanhedrin mentioned in Acts 4:6

Middle Ages
Alexander of Hales, English theologian in the 13th century

Modern
Alexander (magician) (1880–1954), American stage magician specializing in mentalism

People with the given name
People with the given name Alexander or variants include:
Technoblade (1999–2022), American YouTuber, real name Alexander, surname not made public
Alexander Aigner (1909–1988), Austrian mathematician
Alexander Albon (born 1996), Thai-British racing driver
Aleksander Allila (born 1890), Finnish politician
Alexander Vasilyevich Alexandrov (1883–1946), Russian composer
Alexander Argov (1914–1995), Russian-born Israeli composer
Alexander Armah (born 1994), American football player
Alexander Armstrong (born 1970), British comedian and singer
Aleksandr Averbukh (born 1974), Israeli pole vaulter
Alex Baldock (born 1970), British businessman
Alec Baldwin (born 1958), American actor
Alexander Björk (born 1990), Swedish golfer
Alexander Borodin (1833–1887), Russian composer
Alexander Graham Bell (1847–1922), Scottish inventor of the first practical telephone
Aleksander Barkov (born 1995), Finnish ice hockey player
Alexander Calder (1898–1976), American sculptor best known for making mobiles
Aleksandr Davidovich (disambiguation), several people
Alexander Davidson (disambiguation), several people
Alexander Day (disambiguation), several people
Alexander Nicholas de Abrew Abeysinghe (1894-1963), Sri Lankan Sinhala politician
Alex DeBrincat (born 1997), American ice hockey player
Alexander Edmund de Silva Wijegooneratne Samaraweera Rajapakse (1866-1937), Sri Lankan Sinhala politician
Aleksandar Djordjevic (born 1967), Serbian basketball player
Alexander Dubček (1921–1992), leader of Czechoslovakia (1968–1969)
Alex Ebert (born 1978). American singer-songwriter
Alexander Lee Eusebio (born 1988), also known as Alexander or Xander, South Korean singer, member of U-KISS
Alexander Exarch (1810–1891), Bulgarian revivalist, publicist and journalist, participant in the struggle for an independent Bulgarian Exarchate
Alex Ferguson (born 1941), Scottish football player and manager
Alexander Fleming (1881–1955), Scottish discoverer of penicillin
Alexander Zusia Friedman (1897–1943), Polish rabbi, educator, activist, and journalist
Aleksander Gabelic (born 1965), Swedish politician
Alex Galchenyuk (born 1994), American ice hockey player
Alexander Gardner (disambiguation), multiple people
Alexander Glazunov (1865–1936), Russian composer
Alexander Goldberg (born 1974), British rabbi, barrister, and human rights activist
Alexander Goldberg (chemical engineer), Israeli chemical engineer and President of the Technion – Israel Institute of Technology
Alexander Goldscheider (born 1950), Czech/British composer, producer and writer
Alexander Gomelsky (1928–2005), Russian head coach of USSR basketball national team for 30 years
Alexander Gordon (disambiguation), several people
Aleksandr Gordon (1931–2020), Russian-Soviet director, screenwriter and actor
Aleksandr Gorelik (1945–2012), Soviet figure skater
Alexander Gould (born 1994), American actor
Alexander Grothendieck (1928–2014), German-born French mathematician
Alexander Gustafsson (born 1987), Swedish mixed martial arts fighter
Alexander Haig (1924–2010), American general and politician
Alexander Hamilton (1755–1804), first United States Secretary of the Treasury and one of the founding fathers of the United States
Alexander Hamilton Jr. (1786–1875), American attorney and son of Alexander Hamilton
Alexander Hamilton Jr. (1816–1889), son of James Alexander Hamilton and grandson of Alexander Hamilton
Alexander Held (born 1958), German actor
Alexander Henry (1823-1883), mayor of Philadelphia
Alex Higgins (1949–2010), Northern Irish snooker player
Alexander Hollins (born 1996), American football player
Alexander Holtz (born 2002), Swedish ice hockey player
Alex Horne (born 1978), British comedian
Alexander von Humboldt (1769–1859), Prussian naturalist and explorer
Alex Jones (born 1974), American radio show host and conspiracy theorist
Aleksandr Kamshalov (1932–2019), Soviet politician
Alex Kapranos (born 1972), Scottish musician, author, songwriter and producer, front-man of Franz Ferdinand
Aleksandar Katai (born 1991), Serbian footballer
Alexander Kerensky (1881–1970) leader of Russian Provisional Government
Alexander Kerfoot (born 1994), Canadian ice hockey player
Alex Killorn (born 1989), Canadian ice hockey player
Alexander Klingspor (born 1977), Swedish painter and sculptor
Aleksandr Kogan (born 1985/86), Moldovan-born American psychologist and data scientist
Alexander Korda (1893–1956), Hungarian film director
Aleksander Kwaśniewski (born 1954), former President of Poland
Alexander Levinsky (1910–1990), Canadian ice hockey player
Alexander Ivanovich Levitov (1835–1877), Russian writer
Alexander Lévy (born 1990), French golfer
Alexandre Lippmann (1881–1960), French épée fencer
Alexander Ludwig (born 1992), Canadian actor
Alexander "Sandy" Lyle (born 1958), Scottish golfer
Alexander Lukashenko (born 1954), President of Belarus
Alex Manninger (born 1977), Austrian footballer
Alessandro Manzoni (1785–1873), Italian poet and novelist
Alexander "Ali" Marpet (born 1993), American football player
Alexander Mattison (born 1998), American football player
Alexander McClure (1828-1909), American politician, editor and writer
Alexander Lyell McEwin (1897–1988), known as Lyell McEwin, Australian politician, Minister for Health 
Alexander McQueen (1969–2010), British fashion designer and couturier
Alexander Michel Melki (born 1992), Swedish-Lebanese footballer
Alexander Mirsky (born 1964), Latvian politician
Alexander Francis Molamure (1888-1951), 1st Speaker of the State Council of Ceylon and 1st Speaker of the Parliament of Sri Lanka
Alessandro Moreschi (1858–1922), Italian castrato singer
Aleksandr Nikolayev (disambiguation), several people
Alexander Nikolov (boxer) (born 1940), Bulgarian boxer
Alex Norén (born 1982), Swedish golfer
Alexander Nylander (born 1998), Swedish ice hockey player
Alexander O'Neal (born 1953), American singer
Alexander Ovechkin (born 1985), Russian hockey player
Alexander Patch (1889–1945), American general during World War II
Alexander Pechtold (born 1965), Dutch politician
Alexander Penn (1906–1972), Israeli poet
Alexander Perera Jayasuriya (1901-1980), Sri Lankan Sinhala MP and Cabinet Minister
Alexander Pichushkin (born 1974), prolific Russian serial killer
Alex Pietrangelo (born 1990), Canadian ice hockey player
Alexander Piorkowski (1904–1948), German Nazi SS concentration camp commandant executed for war crimes
Alexander Ponomarenko (born 1964), Russian billionaire businessman
Alexander Pope (1688–1744), English poet
Alexander Popov (disambiguation), several people
Alexander Ptushko (1900–1973), Russian film director
Alexander Pushkin (1799–1837), Russian writer
Alexander Radulov (born 1986), Russian ice hockey player
Alexander Ragoza (1858–1919), Russian general in World War I
Alexander Rendell (born 1990), Thai actor and singer
Alex Rodriguez (born 1975), Major League Baseball star, won 3 AL MVP awards, also known as A-Rod
Alexander Rou (1906–1973), Russian film director
Alexander Rowe (born 1992), Australian athlete
Alexander Rudolph ("Al McCoy"; 1894–1966), American boxer
Alexander Rybak (born 1986), Belarusian-born Norwegian artist and violinist
Alexander Salkind (1921–1997), French film producer
Alexander Scriabin (1872–1915), Russian composer and pianist
Alexander Semin (born 1984), Russian hockey player
Alexander Shatilov (born 1987), Uzbek-Israeli artistic gymnast
Alexander Theodore "Sasha" Shulgin (1925–2014), American chemist, psychopharmacologist, and author
Alexander Sieghart (born 1994), Thai footballer
Alexander Stafford, British politician
Alexander Suvorov (1730–1800), Russian military leader, considered a national hero, Count of Rymnik, Count of the Holy Roman Empire, Prince of Italy, and the last Generalissimo of the Russian Empire
Alexander Skarsgård (born 1976), Swedish actor
Alexander McCall Smith (born 1948), Scottish writer
Alexander Solonik (1960–1997), Russian murder victim
Aleksandr Solzhenitsyn (1918–2008), Russian writer, Nobel laureate, Soviet dissident
Alexander Steen (born 1984), Swedish ice hockey player
Alexandre Texier (born 1999), French ice hockey player
Lex van Dam (born 1968), Dutch trader and TV personality
Alexander Van der Bellen (born 1944), President of Austria
Alexander Varchenko (born 1949), Russian mathematician
Aleksander Veingold (born 1953), Estonian and Soviet chess player and coach
Aleksandr Vlasov (disambiguation), several people
Alessandro Volta (1745–1827), Italian physicist
Alexander Wennberg (born 1994), Swedish ice hockey player
Alexander Wilson (disambiguation), several people
Alexander Wijemanne, Sri Lankan Sinhala lawyer and politician
Alex Zanardi (born 1966), Italian racing driver and paracyclist
Alexander Zverev (born 1997), German tennis player

In other languages
 Afrikaans: Alexander
 Albanian: Aleksandër
 Albanian diminutive: Leka
 Amharic: እስክንድር (Isikinidiri, Eskender)
 Arabic: اسكندر (Iskandar)
 Armenian: Ալեքսանդր (Aleksandr)
 Asturian: Alexandru, Xandru
 Azerbaijani: İsgəndər/Исҝәндәр/ایسگندر, Aleksandr/Александр/آلئکساندر
 Basque: Alesander
 Belarusian: Аляксандр (Aliaksandr), Алесь (Ales)
 Bengali: সিকান্দর (Sikandor)
 Bulgarian: Александър (Aleksandŭr), Сашко (Sashko)
 Catalan: Alexandre/Aleixandre
 Chinese: Simplified: 亚历山大 (Yàlìshāndà), Traditional: 亞歷山大 (Yàlìshāndà) 
 Czech: Alexandr, Alexander
 Danish: Aleksander, Alexander
 Dutch: Alexander
 Esperanto: Aleksandro
 Estonian: Aleksander
 English: Alexander 
 Finnish: Aleksanteri
 French: Alexandre, Léandre, Alexis
 Galician: Alexandre
 Georgian: ალექსანდრე (Aleksandre)
 German: Alexander
 Greek
Mycenaean Greek: 𐀀𐀩𐀏𐀭𐀅𐀫 (Aléxandros)
Ancient Greek: Ἀλέξανδρος (Aléxandros)
 Koine Greek: Ἀλέξανδρος (Aléxandros)
 Modern Greek: Αλέξανδρος (Aléxandros)
 Hawaiian: Alekanekelo
 Hebrew: אלכסנדר (Aleksander)
 Hindi: सिकंदर (Sikandar)
 Hungarian: Sándor, Alexander, Elek 
 Icelandic: Alexander
 Indonesian: Iskandar
 Irish: Alastar
 Italian: Alessandro
 Japanese: アレキサンダー (Arekisandā)
 Korean: 알렉산더 (Alleksandeo)
 Kazakh: Искандер (Iskander)
 Kyrgyz: Искендер (Iskender)
 Latin: Alexander 
 Latvian: Aleksandrs
 Lithuanian: Aleksandras
 Macedonian: Александар (Aleksandar), Сашко (Sashko, Saško)
 Malay: Iskandar
 Malayalam 
 Syriac Origin : ചാണ്ടി (t͡ʃaːɳʈI), ഇടിക്കുള (IʈIkkʊɭa) 
 Greek Origin : അലക്സിയോസ് (alaksIyos), അലക്സി (alaksI) 
 Anglican Origin : അലക്സാണ്ടര്‍ (alaksa:ndar), അലക്സ് (alaks)
 Mongolian: Александр (Alyeksandr)
 Norwegian: Aleksander, Alexander
 Pashto: سکندر (Sikandar)
 Persian: الکساندر (Aleksânder), اسکندر (Skandar)
 Polish: Aleksander
 Portuguese: Alexandre, Alexandro, Alessandro, Leandro
 Punjabi: Sikandar
 Romanian: Alexandru, Alex, Sandu
 Russian: Александр (Aleksandr), Саша (Sasha)
 Rusyn: Александер (Aleksander)
 Sanskrit: अलक्षेन्द्र (Alakṣendra)
 Scottish: Alasdair, Alastair, Alistair, Alister
 Serbo-Croatian: Александар / Aleksandar
 Slovak: Alexander
 Slovene: Aleksander
 Spanish: Alejandro
 Swedish: Alexander
 Tagalog: Alejandro
 
 Turkish: İskender
 Ukrainian: Олександр (Oleksandr, sometimes anglicized Olexander), Сашко (Sashko), Олесь (Oles), Олелько (Olelko)
 Urdu: سکندر (Sikandar)
 Valencian: Alecsandro, Aleksandro, Aleixandre, Alexandre
 Vietnamese: Alexander, A Lịch San
 Welsh: Alexander
 Yiddish: אלעקסאנדער (Aleksander)

Variants and diminutives
Alex
Alexey
Xander
Sasha
Alexsander

See also
Alex (disambiguation)
Alexandra
Justice Alexander (disambiguation)
Alexander (surname)

Hera Alexandros, epithet of the Greek goddess Hera

References

Armenian masculine given names
Czech masculine given names
Danish masculine given names
Dutch masculine given names
English-language masculine given names
English masculine given names
German masculine given names
Irish masculine given names
Given names of Greek language origin
Masculine given names
Norwegian masculine given names
Russian masculine given names
Slavic masculine given names
Swedish masculine given names
Welsh masculine given names